Polytrichum ohioense is a species of Polytrichaceae, commonly referred to as Ohio polytrichum moss or Ohio hair-cap moss. It is found on soil and rocks of dry to moist hardwood forests of Eastern North America, New Mexico and Europe.

References

Polytrichaceae
Plants described in 1885